Cynorhinella longinasus , (Shannon, 1924), the  Eastern Longnose  Fly, is a rare species of syrphid fly observed  in New York, Pennsylvania and the New England States Syrphid flies are also known as Hover Flies or Flower Flies because the adults are frequently found hovering around flowers from which they feed on nectar and pollen. Adults are long, black with a distinct conical projecting face.  The larvae are unknown.

References

Eristalinae
Insects described in 1924
Diptera of North America
Hoverflies of North America
Taxa named by Raymond Corbett Shannon